Junga may refer to:
 Junga, Himachal Pradesh, a village and tehsil in India
 Junga (film), an Indian film
 Jung-a, a Korean name (includes a list of people with the name)
 Heinz Junga (born 1943),  German former swimmer

See also 
 Janga (disambiguation)
 Yunga (disambiguation)